Ukraine is administratively divided into 27 regions, one of which is an autonomous republic, the Autonomous Republic of Crimea. Its administrative status is recognized in the Ukrainian Constitution in Chapter X: Autonomous Republic of Crimea and is governed in accordance with laws passed by Ukraine's parliament, the Verkhovna Rada. Following the 2014 Crimean crisis the Autonomous Republic of Crimea was annexed by Russia as the Republic of Crimea. In 2016, the UN General Assembly reaffirmed non-recognition of the annexation and condemned "the temporary occupation of part of the territory of Ukraine—the Autonomous Republic of Crimea and the city of Sevastopol".

List of former republics
In the past, there were two autonomous soviet socialist republics within the general administrative division of the Ukrainian Soviet Socialist Republic.

Notes

References

External links
 

 
Subdivisions of Ukraine
Autonomous republics
Ukraine 1
Ukraine